Jim Salsbury (August 8, 1932 – March 29, 2002) was a guard in the National Football League. He was drafted in the second round of the 1955 NFL Draft and played two seasons with the team. Later he played two seasons with the Green Bay Packers.

References

Alexander Hamilton High School (Los Angeles) alumni
Detroit Lions players
Green Bay Packers players
American football offensive guards
UCLA Bruins football players
1932 births
2002 deaths
Players of American football from Los Angeles